Agdistis nanodes is a moth in the family Pterophoridae. It is known from Egypt, Iran, Pakistan, Sri Lanka, Bahrain, Saudi Arabia, the United Arab Emirates, Oman and Yemen.

References

Agdistinae
Moths of the Middle East
Moths of the Arabian Peninsula
Moths described in 1906